Häggeby och Vreta is a locality situated in Håbo Municipality, Uppsala County, Sweden with 224 inhabitants in 2010.

References 

Populated places in Uppsala County
Populated places in Håbo Municipality